Lehar Singh Siroya is an Indian politician who is a Member of Parliament in the Rajya Sabha from Karnataka since July 2022. Previously Siroya was a  Member of the Karnataka Legislative Council from 14 June 2016 to 14 June 2022. He is a leader of the Bharatiya Janata Party in Karnataka.

A two time MLC, Lehar Singh is an entrepreneur by profession and a politician and member of the Bharatiya Janta Party. A senior party member, he has held various positions in the party from time to time.

In the past, Lehar Singh was suspended from the BJP for sometime for criticising L. K. Advani. On 10 June 2016, he was elected to the Karnataka Legislative Council. He secured 27 first preference votes (13 of BJP MLAs which were left after electing V. Somanna so 14 first preference votes from other independent and smaller party MLAs) and won after adding second preference votes.

Lehar Singh is a staunch follower of Prime Minister Shri Narendra Modi and admires his policies. Lehar Singh is perceived to be close to the then Chief Minister B.S. Yeddyurappa and was a crucial link between the Karnataka BJP unit and High Command.

Political career
While Lehar Singh is known for taking up issues like drug menace and many others, on the other hand he is popular across the country for always being surrounded by controversies. In 2010, Singh sparked an uproar across the country when he published an advertisement in all Hindi dailies congratulating PM Narendra Modi, who was then the Gujarat Chief Minister for having won in the panchayat elections. The advertisement was also interpreted as a response to Sushma Swaraj's statement during her campaign in Bihar where she mocked Narendra Modi for having a reach only in Gujarat and not the rest of the country.

In May 2013, Lehar Singh wrote an open letter alleging that LK Advani, the BJP Party President had compromised on corruption in the past when it suited his interest. He accused  Advani for taking a moral high ground over corruption and pushing for B.S. Yeddyurappa's removal from the BJP, which resulted in the party's loss in the Karnataka state election. Lehar Singh was suspended by the party over the issue.

References

Living people
Rajya Sabha members from Karnataka
Members of the Karnataka Legislative Council
Bharatiya Janata Party politicians from Karnataka
1948 births